Benedict III may refer to:
 Benedict III, Archbishop of Esztergom (died 1276)
 Pope Benedict III (died 858), Pope of the Catholic Church